The Pierce Silver Arrow is a luxury car produced by American luxury automaker Pierce-Arrow in 1933.  Designed by Phillip O. Wright, it was introduced at the 1933 New York Auto Show. Five were built in a record three months.

History 

Five production models were built, but they resembled a more typical Pierce-Arrow and lacked many of the unique features shown in New York. Only three Silver Arrows exist today.

Cars introduced in 1933
Concept cars
Silver Arrow